Stephen Caudel is a British composer and guitarist. He studied at Leeds College of Music where he took a specialist course in Classical and Jazz music and then moved to London to work as a composer and performer. He has met and worked with a wide range of established artists/musicians over the years including Louis Clark, Art Garfunkel, Stanley Myers and John Williams. Caudel’s creative output to date includes 6 albums (4 solo) and several highly individual orchestral works. Having taken a break from music for several years due to family commitments, he currently lives in Cumbria and has returned to music, actively composing and recording again.

Musical Influences
Classical: Mahler, Chopin, Tchaikovsky
Jazz: Gershwin, Django Reinhardt, Stéphane Grappelli (became friends in the late 70s)
Popular: Beatles, Hendrix

Orchestral works
 1983 - Wine Dark Sea (Rock Symphony) – large scale classical/rock piece premiered at London's Victoria Palace Theatre with the Wren Orchestra conducted by Louis Clark of "Hooked on Classics" and ELO fame. 
 1985 - Nostalgie (Rhapsody) – for Classical guitar and Chamber Orchestra 
 1993 - The Edel Rhapsody – for solo Wagner Tuba and Orchestra

Discography
Solo albums:
 1986 - Wine Dark Sea – adaptation of his rock symphony written and premiered in 1983
 1988 - Bow Of Burning Gold 
 1993 - Impromptu Romance 
 1996 - The Earth In Turquoise – second rock/symphonic project
 2016 - Reflections In Blue - Guitar & Orchestra

Other albums
 1982 - Hooked on Classics II - Guest soloist on the Rodrigo Guitar Concerto recorded at London's Abbey Road Studios 
 1995 - Scaramouche – with guitarist Tim Panting

Performing
Toured extensively (Britain, Germany and Japan) including Ronnie Scott’s Jazz Club, Markneukirchen Guitar Festival, Karuizawa Music Festival and 3 nights at London’s Royal Albert Hall as Special Guest of Art Garfunkel.

References

 3.  Content derived from official website ( see link below ) and personal interviews.

External links

Year of birth missing (living people)
Living people
English composers
Musicians from Sheffield
Alumni of Leeds College of Music